The third edition of the Women's Asian Amateur Boxing Championships were held from August 5 to August 12, 2005, in Kaohsiung, Taiwan.

Medalists

Medal table

See also
 List of sporting events in Taiwan

References
amateur-boxing

Asian Amateur Boxing Championships